Meliboeithon is a genus of beetles in the family Buprestidae, the jewel beetles. They are native to Australia. There are six species.

These beetles are black or purplish in color. The adults are often found on the stems of rushes (Juncus spp.).

Species include:

 Meliboeithon bicostatus (Carter, 1928)
 Meliboeithon confusus Bellamy, 1988
 Meliboeithon crassus (Kerremans, 1898)
 Meliboeithon cylindricollis Bellamy, 1988
 Meliboeithon intermedius (Kerremans, 1898)
 Meliboeithon vitticeps (Carter, 1924)

References

Buprestidae genera
Beetles of Australia